Raúl Meza may refer to:

 Raúl Meza Ontiveros (1966–2007), Mexican suspected drug lord
 Raúl Meza Torres (1991–2010), Mexican suspected assassin